Dr. Satyendra Yadav is an Indian politician from Bihar. A social worker, he graduated from Jai Prakash University Chapra in 2005 and holds a Ph.D. from Patna University (2010). He was the former President of Students' Federation of India Bihar state committee. He is currently representing Manjhi (Vidhan Sabha Constituency) in the Bihar State Legislative Assembly representing the Communist Party of India (Marxist).
 
In the 2020 state elections, 43 year old Dr. Satyendra Yadav won the Manjhi seat  for the CPI (M) beating Rana Pratap Singh, an Independent candidate, by a margin of 25386 votes.

Political career 
2020 Vidhan Sabha Election

References 

Communist Party of India (Marxist) politicians
Bihar MLAs 2020–2025
Bihari politicians
Year of birth missing (living people)
Living people